Lakhipurgi Lakhipyari is a 2006 Indian Meitei language film directed by L. Surjakanta and produced by Somen Moirangcha, under the banner of Ebudhou Film Creations. The film features Lairenjam Olen and Devita Urikhinbam in the lead roles. The film is based on Ashok Khurai's novel of the same title. He died during the shooting of the film due to heart attack in 2006.

Synopsis
A betrayed woman Thambal takes revenge by killing her husband which separates herself and her son Amar. Amar grows up under the kind care of an old man at Lakhipur. He falls in love with a local beautiful girl Lakhipyari. As love blossoms, a letter from Imphal interludes to make Amar leaving Lakhipyari. Lakhipyari can't help but to wait for Amar's return.

Cast
 Lairenjam Olen as Amar
 Devita Urikhinbam as Lakhipyari
 Huirem Seema as Thambal, Amar's mother
 Loitongbam Dorendra as Amar's grandfather
 Takhellambam Lokendra as Lakhipyari's father
 R.K. Hemabati as Lakhipyari's mother
 Master Bolex as Amar (Child)
 Baby Priyaluxmi
 Keshoram
 Purnendu
 R.K. Amarjeet (Special Appearance)

Accolades
It won 11 awards at the First Festival of Manipuri Cinema 2007, including Best Feature Film and Best Director Award, won by L. Surjakanta.
 Best Feature Film (Somen Moirangcha & L. Surjakanta)
 Best Director (L. Surjakanta)
 Best Actress (Devita Urikhinbam)
 Best Supporting Actress (Huirem Seema)
 Best Screenplay (Somen Moirangcha)
 Best Story (Ashok Khurai)
 Best Child Artist (Master Bolex)

Soundtrack
Samu (Roubi) composed the soundtrack for the movie and Roshan Sorokhaibam wrote the lyrics.

References

Meitei-language films
2007 films